Aman Magan (also Romanized as Āmān Magān; also known as Āmān Margān and Āmān Qal‘eh) is a village in Dorungar Rural District, Now Khandan District, Dargaz County, Razavi Khorasan Province, Iran. At the 2006 census, its population was 98, in 24 families.

See also 

 List of cities, towns and villages in Razavi Khorasan Province

References 

Populated places in Dargaz County